Motley County is a county located in the U.S. state of Texas. As of the 2020 census, its population was 1,063, making it the 10th-least populous county in Texas. Its county seat is Matador. The county was created in 1876 and organized in 1891. It is named for Junius William Mottley, a signer of the Texas Declaration of Independence. Mottley's name is spelled incorrectly because the bill establishing the county misspelled his name. Motley County was one of 30 prohibition, or entirely dry, counties in Texas, but is now a wet county.

Geography

Major highways
   U.S. Highway 62/U.S. Highway 70
  State Highway 70

Adjacent counties
 Hall County (north)
 Cottle County (east)
 Dickens County (south)
 Floyd County (west)
 Briscoe County (northwest)
 King County (northwest)

Demographics

Note: the US Census treats Hispanic/Latino as an ethnic category. This table excludes Latinos from the racial categories and assigns them to a separate category. Hispanics/Latinos can be of any race.

As of the census of 2000,  1,426 people, 606 households, and 435 families were residing in the county.  The population density was 1 person/sq mi (1/km2).  The 839 housing units  averaged 1/sq mi (0.5/km2).  The racial makeup of the county was 87.38% White, 3.51% African American, 0.63% Native American, 0.14% Asian, 0.14% Pacific Islander, 6.31% from other races, and 1.89% from two or more races. About 12.13% of the population were Hispanics or Latinos of any race.

Of the 606 households,  26.60% had children under 18 living with them, 60.20% were married couples living together, 8.70% had a female householder with no husband present, and 28.20% were not families. About 25.70% of all households were made up of individuals, and 15.30% had someone living alone who was 65 or older.  The average household size was 2.35 and the average family size was 2.82.

In the county, the age distribution was 24.00% under 18, 6.00% from 18 to 24, 21.10% from 25 to 44, 25.20% from 45 to 64, and 23.70% who were 65 or older.  The median age was 44 years. For every 100 females, there were 101.70 males.  For every 100 females age 18 and over, there were 92.90 males.

The median income for a household in the county was $28,348, and for a family was $33,977. Males had a median income of $25,395 versus $13,333 for females. The per capita income for the county was $16,584.  About 13.90% of families and 19.40% of the population were below the poverty line, including 35.30% of those under age 18 and 13.80% of those age 65 or over.

Communities

Towns
 Matador (county seat)
 Roaring Springs

Unincorporated community
 Flomot

Ghost towns
 Tee Pee City
 Whiteflat

Politics

Education
School districts serving the county include:
 Motley County Independent School District
 Turkey-Quitaque Independent School District

The county is in the service area of South Plains College.

See also

 Dry counties
 Quitaque Creek
 National Register of Historic Places listings in Motley County, Texas
 Recorded Texas Historic Landmarks in Motley County

References

External links
 Motley County government’s website
 
 
 Motley County Profile from the Texas Association of Counties
 Historic Motley County materials, hosted by the Portal to Texas History.

 
1891 establishments in Texas
Populated places established in 1891